Dichomeris limosellus is a moth of the family Gelechiidae. It is found in most of Europe, except Ireland, Great Britain, Norway, the Iberian Peninsula and part of the Balkan Peninsula.

The wingspan is 19–22 mm. Adults are on wing from May to late June and again from July to September in two generations per year.

The larvae feed on Lotus, Medicago sativa and Trifolium.

References

Moths described in 1849
limosellus
Moths of Europe
Moths of Asia